Warendorf is an electoral constituency (German: Wahlkreis) represented in the Bundestag. It elects one member via first-past-the-post voting. Under the current constituency numbering system, it is designated as constituency 130. It is located in northern North Rhine-Westphalia, comprising the district of Warendorf.

Warendorf was created for the inaugural 1949 federal election. Since 2021, it has been represented by Henning Rehbaum of the Christian Democratic Union (CDU).

Geography
Warendorf is located in northern North Rhine-Westphalia. As of the 2021 federal election, it is coterminous with the district of Warendorf.

History
Warendorf was created in 1949, then known as Beckum – Warendorf. It acquired its current name in the 1980 election. In the 1949 election, it was North Rhine-Westphalia constituency 37 in the numbering system. From 1953 through 1961, it was number 96. From 1965 through 1976, it was number 94. From 1980 through 1998, it was number 100. From 2002 through 2009, it was number 131. Since 2013, it has been number 130.

Originally, the constituency comprised the districts of Warendorf and Beckum. Since the 1980 election, it has been coterminous with the district of Warendorf.

Members
The constituency has been held continuously by the Christian Democratic Union (CDU) since its creation. It was first represented by Bernhard Raestrup from 1949 to 1957. Heinrich Windelen then served from 1957 to 1990. Peter Paziorek was representative from 1990 to 2009. Reinhold Sendker was elected in 2009, and re-elected in 2013 and 2017. He was succeeded by Henning Rehbaum in 2021.

Election results

2021 election

2017 election

2013 election

2009 election

References

Federal electoral districts in North Rhine-Westphalia
1949 establishments in West Germany
Constituencies established in 1949
Warendorf (district)